Jordanian Arabic is a dialect continuum of mutually intelligible varieties of Arabic spoken by the population of the Hashemite Kingdom of Jordan.

Jordanian Arabic can be divided into sedentary and Bedouin varieties. Sedentary varieties belong to the Levantine Arabic dialect continuum. Bedouin varieties are further divided into two groups, Northwest Arabian Arabic varieties of the south, and Najdi Arabic and Shawi Arabic varieties of the north.

Jordanian Arabic varieties are Semitic. They are spoken by more than 6 million people, and understood throughout the Levant and, to various extents, in other Arabic-speaking regions. As in all Arab countries, language use in Jordan is characterized by diglossia; Modern Standard Arabic is the official language used in most written documents and the media, while daily conversation is conducted in the local colloquial varieties.

Regional Jordanian Arabic varieties 
Although there is a common Jordanian dialect mutually understood by most Jordanians, the daily language spoken throughout the country varies significantly through regions. These variants impact altogether pronunciation, grammar, and vocabulary.

Jordanian Arabic can primarily be divided into sedentary and Bedouin varieties, each of which can be further divided into distinct subgroups:

Sedentary varieties

Hybrid variety (Modern Jordanian)/Ammani: It is the most current spoken language among Jordanians. This variety was born after the designation of Amman as capital of the Jordanian kingdom early in the 20th century. It is the result of the merger of the language of populations who moved from northern Jordan, southern Jordan, Saudi Arabia and later from Palestine. For this reason, it mixes features of the Arabic varieties spoken by these populations. The emergence of the language occurred under the strong influence of the northern Jordanian dialect. As in many countries English is used to substitute many technical words, even though these words have Arabic counterparts in modern standard Arabic.
 Balgawi-Horani: Mostly spoken in the area from Amman to Irbid in the far north. As in all sedentary areas, local variations are many. The pronunciation has /q/ pronounced [g] and /k/ mostly ([tʃ]). This dialect is part of the southern dialect of the Levantine Arabic language.
 Southern/Moab: Spoken in the area south of Amman, in cities such as Karak, Tafilah, Ma'an, Shoubak and their countrysides, it is replete with city-to-city and village-to-village differences. In this dialect, the pronunciation of the final vowel (æ~a~ə) commonly written with tāʾ marbūtah (ة) is raised to [e]. For example, Maktaba (Fuṣḥa) becomes Maktabe (Moab), Maktabeh (North) and Mektaba (Bedawi). Named after the ancient Moab kingdom that was located in southern Jordan, this dialect belongs to the outer southern dialect of the Levantine Arabic language.
 Aqaba variety

Bedouin varieties

 Northwest Arabian Arabic: Spoken by the Hwetat, Bani Atiya, the Bdul of Petra, and N’emat tribes in Southern Jordan. According to Palva, the dialects spoken in Jordan belong to the Eastern group of NWA dialects. Nevertheless, the dialects of the Bdul and N’emat share features with the Western group of NWA dialects spoken in the Negev. In addition, the dialect of the Zawaida tribe is argued to be closely related to Negev Arabic.
 North Arabian dialects: Spoken by the Sirhan, Bani Saxar, and Bani Khalid tribes. They are further divided into Anazi-type dialects which are related to Central Najdi Arabic, and Shammari-type dialects which are related to Northern Najdi Arabic.
 Syro-Mesopotamian Bedouin dialects: These dialects show many similarities with Iraqi “gelet”-dialects and with Gulf Arabic. Herin divides this group into a Central “ygulu” and Northern “ygulun” Shawi Arabic, both types being identical except for the presence of /n/ in the plural imperfect of the latter group. The Central “ygulu” dialects are spoken by the Ajarma, Adwan, and Ababid tribes.

Phonology

Consonants 

  is realized as a voiced fricative , across different speakers and dialects.
 /t͡ʃ/ is a lexically-distributed alternant of /k/ in sedentary Horani/Balqawi dialects. [t͡ʃ] is historically also an allophone of /k/ in the Syro-Mesopotamian Bedouin dialects.

Vowels 

 /e/ and /i/ are only contrastive word-finally as shown by the minimal pair kalbe “dog (f.)” and kalbi “my dog”. 
 /o/ and /u/ are only contrastive word-finally as shown by the minimal pair katabo “he wrote it” vs. katabu “they wrote”.

Stress
One syllable of every Jordanian word has more stress than the other syllables of that word. Some meaning is communicated in Jordanian by the location of the stress of the vowel. So, changing the stress position changes the meaning (e.g. ['katabu] means they wrote while [kata'bu] means they wrote it). This means one has to listen and pronounce the stress carefully.

Grammar
The grammar in Jordanian also in Palestinian is a mixture. Much like Hebrew and Arabic, Jordanian dielct is Arabic and Arabic is a Semitic language at heart, altered by the many influences that developed over the years.

Nominal morphology

Definiteness 
/il-/ is used in most words that don't start with a vowel. It is affixed onto the following word. Il-bāb meaning the door. /iC-/ is used in words that start with a consonant produced by the blade of the tongue (t, ṭ, d, ḍ, r, z, ẓ, ž, s, ṣ, š, n. Sometimes [l] and [j] as well depending on the dialect). This causes a doubling of the consonant. This e is pronounced as in a rounded short backward vowel or as in an e followed by the first letter of the word that follows the article. For example: ed-desk meaning the desk, ej-jakét meaning the jacket, es-seks meaning the sex or hāda' et-téléfón meaning that is the telephone.

Pronouns 
Contrary to MSA, dual pronouns do not exist in Jordanian; the plural is used instead. Because conjugated verbs indicate the subject with a prefix or a suffix, independent subject pronouns are usually unnecessary and mainly used for emphasis. Feminine plural forms modifying human females are found primarily in rural and Bedouin areas.

Bound pronouns typically attach to nouns, prepositions, verbs andalso to certain adverbs, conjunctions and other discourse markers:

Indirect object / dative pronouns arise from the merging of l- “for, to”, and the bound pronouns. Note that geminated forms like Ammani after-CC katabt-illo  “I wrote for him” are not to be found in Salti, which has katab(ə)t-lo:

Demonstratives can appear pre-nominally or post-nominally

Verbal morphology

Form I

Strong verbs 
In Amman, Form I strong verbs usually have perfect CaCaC with imperfect CCuC/CCaC, and perfect CiCiC with imperfect CCaC. In Salt, CaCaC and CiCiC can occur with imperfect CCiC.

Geminated verbs 
Geminate verbs generally have perfect CaCC and imperfect CiCC. In Amman and Salt, the 2nd person singular masculine and the 1st person singular perfect inflect as CaCCēt: ḥassēt, šaddēt. In Amman, the active participle alternates between CāCC and CāCC (ḥāss and ḥāsis). In Salt, only CāCC (ḥāss) is present.

Verbs Iʾ

Verbs Iw/y 
Note that Salt forms the perfect on a different template than Amman. In any case, the perfect is conjugated as a strong verb:

Verbs IIw/y 
The vowel of the short base of the perfect usually has the same quality as the vowel of the imperfect: gām~ygūm~gumt and gām~ygīm~gimt. An exception is šāf~yšūf~šuft. Verbs with yCāC imperfects usually have CiCt perfects.

Verbs IIIw/y 
In the perfect, both CaCa and CiCi are found.

Form IV 
Form IV is not productive in the sedentary dialects of Amman or Karak. A conservative feature of the sedentary Balqāwi-Hōrani group is the preservation of Form IV, which is productive in three uses:

 to create transitive verbs from nouns and adjectives:
 bʿad—yibʿid “to go away” (from bʿīd “far”)
 to create “weather verbs”:
 štat—tišti “to rain”
 to derive causative verbs from intransitive verbs with stem CvCvC:
 gʿad—yigʿid “to wake sth. up” (from gaʿad—yugʿud “to sit down”)

Negation 
Qdar is the infinitive form of the verb can. Baqdar means I can, I can't is Baqdareş, adding an eş or ış to the end of a verb makes it negative; if the word ends in a vowel then a ş should be enough.

An in-depth example of the negation: Baqdarelhomm figuratively means I can handle them, Baqdarelhommeş means I cannot handle them, the same statement meaning can be achieved by Baqdareş l'ıl homm

Legal status
Jordanian Arabic is not regarded as the official language even though it has diverged significantly from Classic Arabic and Modern Standard Arabic (MSA). A large number of Jordanians, however, call their language "Arabic", while referring to the original Arabic language as Fusħa. This is common in many countries that speak languages or dialects derived from Arabic and can prove to be quite confusing. Whenever a book is published, it is usually published in English, French, or in MSA and not in Levantine.

Writing systems

General remarks
There are many ways of representing Levantine Arabic in writing. The most common is the scholastic Jordanian Latin alphabet (JLA) system which uses many accents to distinguish between the sounds (this system is used within this article). Other Levantine countries, however, use their own alphabets and transliterations, making cross-border communication inconvenient.

Consonants
There are some phonemes of the Jordanian language that are easily pronounced by English speakers; others are completely foreign to English, making these sounds difficult to pronounce.

Vowels
Contrasting with the rich consonant inventory, Jordanian Arabic has much fewer vowels than English. Yet, as in English, vowel duration is relevant (compare /i/ in bin and bean).

External Influences

Modern Standard Arabic (MSA) is spoken in formal TV programs, and in Modern Standard Arabic classes, as well as to quote poetry and historical phrases. It is also the language used to write and read in formal situations if English is not being used. However, MSA is not spoken during regular conversations. MSA is taught in most schools and a large number of Jordanian citizens are proficient in reading and writing formal Arabic. However, foreigners residing in Jordan who learn the Levantine language generally find it difficult to comprehend formal MSA, particularly if they did not attend a school that teaches it.

Other influences include English, French, Turkish, and Persian. Many loan words from these languages can be found in the Jordanian dialects, particularly English. However, students also have the option of learning French in schools. Currently, there is a small society of French speakers called Francophone and it is quite notable in the country. The language is also spoken by people who are interested in the cultural and commercial features of France.

See also
 English-based creole language
 Jordan Academy of Arabic

References

Further reading

External links

Arabs in Jordan
Languages of Jordan
South Levantine Arabic